The 2021 World Mixed Doubles Curling Championship was held from May 17 to 23 in Aberdeen, Scotland.

Because of cancellations due to the COVID-19 pandemic, this was the first of two events for mixed doubles teams to qualify for the 2022 Olympics as part of the 2022 Winter Olympic Qualification process. The top seven National Olympic Committee teams from the championship qualified directly for the Olympics. China, as the host country for the Olympics, was already guaranteed an entry for a team selected by its national Olympic committee. The remaining two qualifying teams were determined at the 2021 Olympic Qualification Event, which was open to any nation that qualified for the 2020 or 2021 world mixed doubles championships (not already qualified for the Olympics) as well as the top three nations from the 2021 Pre-Olympic Qualification Event.

Qualification
The following nations qualified to participate in the 2021 World Mixed Doubles Curling Championship:  Pursuant to a December 2020 ruling by the Court of Arbitration for Sport due to the Russian doping scandal, Russia is prohibited from competing under its flag or any national symbols at any Olympic Games or world championships through 16 December 2022, and therefore the Russian team is competing neutrally representing the Russian Curling Federation (RCF).

World Ranking
The World Curling Federation World Ranking tracks and lists the success of all Member Associations.

Teams
The teams are as follows:

Round-robin standings
Final round-robin standings

Round-robin results

All draw times are listed in British Summer Time (UTC+01:00).

Draw 1
Monday, May 17, 5:30 pm

Draw 2
Monday, May 17, 9:00 pm

Draw 3
Tuesday, May 18, 9:00 am

Draw 4
Tuesday, May 18, 12:30 pm

Draw 5
Tuesday, May 18, 4:00 pm

Draw 6
Tuesday, May 18, 7:30 pm

Draw 7
Wednesday, May 19, 9:00 am

Draw 8
Wednesday, May 19, 12:30 pm

Draw 9
Wednesday, May 19, 4:00 pm

Draw 10
Wednesday, May 19, 7:30 pm

Draw 11
Thursday, May 20, 9:00 am

Draw 12
Thursday, May 20, 12:30 pm

Draw 13
Thursday, May 20, 4:00 pm

Draw 14
Thursday, May 20, 7:30 pm

Draw 15
Friday, May 21, 9:00 am

Draw 16
Friday, May 21, 12:30 pm

Draw 17
Friday, May 21, 4:00 pm

Draw 18
Friday, May 21, 7:30 pm

Relegation playoff
Saturday, May 22, 10:00 am

Olympic Qualification Round
Saturday, May 22, 4:00 pm

Playoffs

Qualification Games
Saturday, May 22, 10:00 am

Semifinal 1
Saturday, May 22, 4:00 pm

Semifinal 2
Saturday, May 22, 7:30 pm

Bronze medal game
Sunday, May 23, 10:00 am

Final
Sunday, May 23, 3:00 pm

Statistics

Top 5 player percentages
Final Round Robin Percentages

Final standings

References

World Mixed Doubles Curling Championship
World Mixed Doubles Curling Championship
World Mixed Doubles Curling
World Mixed Doubles Curling Championship
Sports competitions in Aberdeen
International curling competitions hosted by Scotland